Exciter is the tenth studio album by English electronic music band Depeche Mode. It was first released on 14 May 2001 in the United Kingdom by Mute Records and a day later in the United States by Reprise Records. The album was produced by Mark Bell, and was supported by the Exciter Tour, one of the band's most successful tours.

Exciter debuted at number nine on the UK Albums Chart and number eight on the Billboard 200, selling 115,000 copies in its first week in the United States. It was the only Depeche Mode album to debut higher in the United States than in the United Kingdom. As of April 2006, Exciter had sold over 426,000 copies in the US, and has been certified gold by the Recording Industry Association of America (RIAA); it has also been certified gold in Canada for shipments of 50,000 units.

The plant that appears on the cover is the Agave attenuata, a species of agave sometimes known as the "lion's tail", "swan's neck", or "foxtail" for its development of a curved stem, unusual among agaves.

Background and composition
Lyrically, the album covers many different subjects. Martin Gore said that "The Dead of Night" was inspired by a club in London where there were a lot of drugs and mayhem. Gore told MTV Europe that "I Feel Loved" is about when you "feel absolutely like shit, and you feel the worst you've ever felt in your life. Then somehow you think: 'the universe must like me, for making me feel like this'".

Musically, Exciter can be described as a very atmospheric and electronic album. Gore had stated that he had been listening to more abstract electronic music in the lead up to recording Exciter, which could have influenced some of the more experimental soundscapes on the album. The group also often cited producer Mark Bell as a major inspiration in the making of Exciter as Gahan states that Mark Bell helped make him a more confident vocalist. The band also worked with Paul Freegard and long-time collaborator Gareth Jones, who were involved with pre-production and programming.

On top of the electronic soundscapes, Depeche Mode also added elements of traditional blues, retro funk, progressive rock, and orchestral pop to its arrangements. Bell told Keyboard magazine that they treated the acoustic and electronic sounds on the track "Dream On" the same. Gore felt that many songs of the album including "When the Body Speaks" have a 1950s or 1960s sound to them. "Comatose" was massively stripped down from the original demo since the band wanted a more minimalistic arrangement. "Freelove" was one of the final tracks to be completed on the album. "The Dead of Night" features a harsher sound compared to other tracks on the album, making heavy use of analogue synths such as the EMS Synthi AKS; the practice of largely using analogue synths would become common on later albums by the band. 

Bell found working with the group fun but strange, stating he had listened to the group when he was 12 and found the band asking him for days off or "what they should eat". According to an interview with Gahan in 2003, Gore's lack of involvement with the production led to Bell feeling frustrated and that he was essentially creating the album for the band.

Reception

Exciter received generally positive reviews. While many critics praised the album's experimental and digital soundscapes, many felt it was one of the weakest Depeche Mode albums. 

In a positive review, NME wrote that "Not many long-running groups could make an album this fresh and confident in their 20th year, never mind one which bridges timeless soulman crooning and underground techno". Rolling Stone complimented the album's minimal arrangements, comparing them to early Kraftwerk. The A.V. Club complimented Mark Bell's production on the album, stating that "Bell's subtle, inventive knob-twiddling pairs perfectly with Martin Gore's new batch of somber, subdued songs".

In contrast, Q Magazine was much more negative in their interpretation of the project, writing: "This time it's Martin Gore who's out of puff. No amount of fashionable tweaking can hide the flimsiness of his offerings". 

Despite some mixed reviews, Exciter still appeared on several EOY 2001 lists such as Magic, MusikExpress, Rocksound, Rumba, Visions, and Woxy.

Accolades

Re-release
On 2 October 2007 (3 October in North America), Exciter was re-released as a two-disc set, along with Ultra, in the fourth and final set of Depeche Mode reissues. The first disc was a remastered version of the original, on an SACD/CD hybrid (only a CD in the US). The second disc is a DVD which features the album in DTS 5.1, Dolby Digital 5.1 and PCM Stereo. The B-sides from Exciter as well as the single version of "Freelove" are included. There are also audio versions of all the live Exciter tracks played during the One Night in Paris film.

Like the other reissues, there is a documentary on the making of Exciter titled Depeche Mode 1999–2001 (Presenting the Intimate and Delicate Side of Depeche Mode). The documentary begins with the talks of Gore's writer's block and what they did about it. It also discusses the first three singles, the recording, the cover art and the Exciter tour (including one of the opening acts, Fad Gadget). The documentary is around 30 minutes long. The three members of the band are interviewed along with Daniel Miller, Christian Eigner, Peter Gordeno, Anton Corbijn, and Mute label representatives. The documentary ends with a "To Be Continued..."

Producer Mark Bell does not appear, and although they discuss the fact that the band decided not to have Corbijn direct Exciters music videos, they do not interview the two who did direct them. However, John Hillcoat, who directed "I Feel Loved", "Freelove" and "Goodnight Lovers", is mentioned in passing.

Track listing
All lead vocals by Dave Gahan, except where noted.

2007 Collectors Edition (CD + DVD)
 Disc one is a hybrid SACD/CD with a multi-channel SACD layer.
 Disc two is a DVD which includes "Exciter" in DTS 5.1, Dolby Digital 5.1 and PCM Stereo plus bonus material

 "Dream On" – 4:19
 "Shine" – 5:32
 "The Sweetest Condition" – 3:42
 "When the Body Speaks" – 6:01
 "The Dead of Night" – 4:50
 "Lovetheme" – 2:02
 "Freelove" – 6:10
 "Comatose" – 3:24
 "I Feel Loved" – 4:20
 "Breathe" – 5:17
 "Easy Tiger" – 2:05
 "I Am You" – 5:10
 "Goodnight Lovers" – 3:48Live in Paris, October 2001 (in DTS 5.1, Dolby Digital 5.1, PCM Stereo): "The Dead of Night"
 "The Sweetest Condition"
 "Dream On"
 "When the Body Speaks"
 "Breathe"
 "Freelove"Bonus tracks (in PCM Stereo): "Easy Tiger" (Full Version)
 "Dirt" (cover of a song written and performed by The Stooges)
 "Freelove" (Flood Mix) [not listed on the back cover]
 "Zenstation"
 "When the Body Speaks" (Acoustic)Additional material:'''
 Depeche Mode 1999–2001 (Presenting the Intimate and Delicate Side of Depeche Mode) – 30:00
 End Credits – 2:23

Personnel
Credits adapted from the liner notes of Exciter''.

Depeche Mode
 Dave Gahan
 Martin Gore
 Andrew Fletcher

Additional musicians
 Knox Chandler – solo cello, string arrangement 
 Todd C. Reynolds – strings 
 Joyce Hammann – strings 
 Natalie Cenovia Cummins – strings 
 Ralph H. Farris – strings 
 Leo Grinhauz – strings 
 Airto Moreira – percussion 
 Christian Eigner – drums

Technical
 Mark Bell – production
 Gareth Jones – engineering, pre-production, additional production
 Paul Freegard – pre-production, additional production
 Steve Fitzmaurice – mixing
 Boris Aldridge – engineering assistance
 Andrew Davies – engineering assistance
 Andrew Griffiths – engineering assistance
 Nick Sevilla – engineering assistance
 Lisa Butterworth – engineering assistance
 Jonathan Adler – engineering assistance
 Alissa Myhowich – engineering assistance
 James Chang – engineering assistance
 Mike Marsh – mastering at The Exchange (London)

Artwork
 Anton Corbijn – photography, cover art, art direction
 Form – design

Charts

Weekly charts

Year-end charts

Certifications and sales

See also
 List of number-one albums of 2001 (Poland)
 List of number-one hits of 2001 (France)

References

External links

 Album information from the official Depeche Mode website
 Official remaster info

2001 albums
Albums produced by Mark Bell (British musician)
Albums recorded at Electric Lady Studios
Albums recorded at RAK Studios
Depeche Mode albums
Mute Records albums
Reprise Records albums